Sara Aerts (born 25 January 1984) is a Belgian athlete who specialises in the heptathlon and bobsledder.

Aerts was born in Turnhout.  She competed at the 2012 Summer Olympics in the heptathlon but did not finish the competition.

Competition record

References

External links 

 
 
 
 
 

1984 births
Living people
Sportspeople from Turnhout
Belgian heptathletes
Olympic athletes of Belgium
Athletes (track and field) at the 2012 Summer Olympics
Universiade medalists in athletics (track and field)
Bobsledders at the 2018 Winter Olympics
Bobsledders at the 2022 Winter Olympics
Olympic bobsledders of Belgium
Belgian female bobsledders
Universiade silver medalists for Belgium
Belgian female hurdlers
Medalists at the 2007 Summer Universiade
21st-century Belgian women